Manahan Stadium is a multi-purpose stadium in Surakarta, Central Java, Indonesia. Manahan is the first stadium in Indonesia which hosts the biggest disabled sporting event in Southeast Asia, the 2011 ASEAN Para Games. The stadium was opened on 21 February 1998. It is currently used mostly for association football matches and is used as the home venue for Persis Solo. This stadium now holds 20,000 spectators after the renovation. The stadium is set to be used as one of the venues for the 2023 FIFA U-20 World Cup including the final .

Judging from the geographical location, the location of Manahan Stadium in Solo is fairly strategic. Stands majestically in the middle of the city center, adjacent to airports, hotels, highways and shopping malls make Manahan Stadium as one of the most representative in the organization of sporting events of national and international scale. The stadium is located in the center of the city of Solo, precisely at Jalan Adi Sucipto, Manahan, Banjarsari, Solo. It is 9 Kilometers away from the Adisumarmo International Airport.

History
Manahan Stadium was built in 1989 using land area of 170,000 m2 and a building area of 33,300 m2. On 21 February 1998, the stadium was inaugurated by the then-Indonesian president Suharto.

Facilities
Facilities into one building stadiums with tracks including the track Manahan / international-standard athletics, dressing room, heating room, health room, a secretariat, a journalist and a press conference room, other facilities are located in the stadium track long jump, table tennis, judo training, fight training degrees, etc..

While at Manahan's own complex, sports facilities are available even somewhat more complete and varied as there are tennis courts, baseball field, cycling (Velodrome), volleyball court, basketball court, badminton court, table tennis room, billiard room, 3 football pitches and gymnasium Multipurpose (GOR).

Further development
Revitalization of the stadium was in September, 2019. After renovation, it is expected to transform into a mini Bung Karno Stadium (GBK). Seating arrangement is single which reduced the capacity of spectators to 20,000. The stadium is equipped with a standard broadcast lighting system of 2,200 to 2,400 lux. Sophisticated CCTV installed to support security with emergency conditions also be designed to be emptied within 15 minutes.

Sporting events
 2006 Liga Indonesia Final between Persik Kediri vs PSIS Semarang
 2007 AFC Champions League, home of Persik Kediri
 2010 Piala Indonesia Final between Arema Indonesia vs Sriwijaya F.C.
 2010 AFF U-16 Youth Championship
 2011 ASEAN Para Games
 2013 AFC Cup, home of Persibo Bojonegoro
 2017 Indonesia President's Cup quarter-finals
 2018 Indonesia President's Cup quarter-finals
 2022 ASEAN Para Games
 2023 FIFA U-20 World Cup

International matches

Gallery

See also
 List of stadiums in Indonesia

References 

Persis Solo
Sport in Surakarta
Sports venues in Indonesia
Football venues in Indonesia
Athletics (track and field) venues in Indonesia
Multi-purpose stadiums in Indonesia
Football venues in Central Java
Athletics (track and field) venues in Central Java
Multi-purpose stadiums in Central Java
Sports venues in Surakarta
Buildings and structures in Surakarta
Sports venues completed in 1998
1998 establishments in Indonesia